Veda Slovena (Веда Словена in Modern Bulgarian, originally written as Веда Словенахъ) is an ethnographic collection of folk songs and legends of the Muslim Bulgarians; the subtitle of the book indicated that they were collected from the regions of Thrace and Macedonia (see image right). The first volume of which was printed in 1874 in Belgrade and the second in 1881 in Saint Petersburg under the authorship of Bosnian Croat Stjepan Verković. The collection was assembled by Bulgarian teacher Ivan Gologanov for 12 years and is famous for containing numerous elements of ancient Slavic mythology notwithstanding the conversions first to Christianity and then to Islam.

Veda Slovena has been alleged to have been partly or fully forged by Gologanov ever since its publication, dividing scholarly circles into two groups, the one considering the texts to be forged, the other defending their genuineness. Recently editions like "Bulgarian Encyclopaedia" consider Veda Slovena to be a mystification.

See also 
 Folk Songs of the Macedonian Bulgarians

References

External links
 ВЕДА СЛОВЕНА/VEDA SLOVENA/LE VEDA SLAVE - Београдъ, 1874 - US archive, Oxford university (full scanned copy) 
Full text of Veda Slovena (in dialectal Bulgarian and Cyrillic)
 The Veda Slovena mystery (Archive.org)
 Lexical analysis of Veda Slovena

Slavic mythology
Bulgarian folklore
1874 books
Books about Bulgaria